Edward Lee Hicks (23 December 1843 – 14 August 1919) was an eminent Anglican priest and author who served as Bishop of Lincoln 1910–1919.

Life and works
Born in Oxford in 1843, Hicks was educated at Magdalen College School and Brasenose College, Oxford  and  ordained in 1886. After a spell as Fellow and Tutor at Corpus Christi College, Oxford he was Rector of Fenny Compton before becoming Warden of Hulme Hall in 1886. After this he was a canon residentiary wason Manchester Cathedral, then Rural Dean of Salford until his elevation to the episcopate.   He had not been supported by the Archbishop of Canterbury for the post. ‘I do not think Hicks would do for Lincoln .... ‘ The Archbishop regarded Hicks as a ‘faddist’ who threw ‘himself eagerly not to say fanatically into any cause which he espouses’. But at that time Prime Minister H. H. Asquith was the key figure in episcopal appointments and, influenced by Hicks as a ‘strong Liberal in politics’, recommended him to the Crown for the post at Lincoln.

During the First World War, unlike other bishops, Hicks did not encourage recruitment to the Forces nor did he condemn Germany. He was peace-loving, and had promoted ‘an honourable neutrality of Great Britain'.  He was accused of cowardice, and produced a strong reply to his critics showing prescience of what the "Great War" would involve. ‘Anyone who knows what war means - its stoppage of industry, its heaping up of debt and taxation, its unemployment, its famine, its missing at home, its paralysis of all effective work and expenditure on Social Reform, not to mention the horrible carnage of the battlefield, the agonies of the wounded, the visitations of disease and pestilence that always follow campaigns and battles - will be the last to tax me with cowardice if I confess to a loathing of war.’ During that War, he lost a son, Edwin, in 1917 and gave up part and eventually the whole of his palace, first for the use of Belgian refugees and then to the Red Cross. Novelist and biographer Penelope Fitzgerald was his granddaughter.

References

Further reading
GR Evans, Edward Hicks: Pacifist Bishop at War, Lion Hudson, 2014, 
JH Fowler, The Life and Letters of Edward Lee Hicks, London: Chroistophers, 1922
Graham Neville, Radical Churchman: Edward Lee Hicks and the New Liberalism, Oxford University Press, 1998, 

1843 births
People from Oxford
People educated at Magdalen College School, Oxford
Alumni of Brasenose College, Oxford
Fellows of Corpus Christi College, Oxford
Bishops of Lincoln
1919 deaths
Anglican pacifists
Presidents of the Classical Association